Romanian Journal of Political Science is a biannual blind peer-reviewed academic journal covering political science, especially concerning comparative politics, public policy, political economy, or political psychology, covering Romanian or broader Central or South-East European issues. The editor-in-chief is Alina Mungiu-Pippidi (Hertie School of Governance).

According to the Journal Citation Reports, the journal has a 2016 impact factor of 0.458, ranking it 132nd out of 165 journals in the category "Political Science".

References

External links 
 

Political science journals
English-language journals
Biannual journals
Publications established in 2001
Political science in Romania